Shingo Kunieda defeated Gordon Reid in the final, 6–4, 6–4 to win the men's singles wheelchair tennis title at the 2020 Australian Open. It was his tenth Australian Open singles title and 23rd major singles title overall.

Gustavo Fernández was the defending champion, but was defeated by Reid in the quarterfinals.

Seeds

Draw

Bracket

References

External links
 Drawsheet on ausopen.com

Wheelchair Men's Singles
2020 Men's Singles